The Indian leftwing writers protest against government silence on violence was a famous protest in India.
Starting from the beginning of September 2015, some disgruntled writers and poets in India had started returning the Sahitya Akademi Award to protest the incidents of so-called communal violence in India. They believed that there was rising intolerance in the country under the present central government (NDA Alliance).
Some well-known writers and poets had also resigned their posts in the General Council of the country's top literary body, saying that they were shocked at the level of intolerance on freedom of speech and expression. This incident is also referred to as Award Wapsi and the individuals returning the awards are widely referred as Award Wapsi Gang.

Writer Uday Prakash a passionate communist party member, who later lost interest in political ideology,was the first to return the award on September 4, 2015, protesting against the murder of MM Kalburgi. Writer Nayantara Sahgal and poet Ashok Vajpeyi followed Prakash in protesting the murders of activists like MM Kalburgi, Govind Pansare and Narendra Dabholkar. They also came out against the shocking Dadri incident, in which a mob lynched a Muslim man in Greater Noida over rumours of eating and storing beef.

Sahitya akademi

List of writers who have returned their awards 

As of 15 October 2015, more than 40 individuals returned their awards:

Statements made by writers

List of writers who resigned from Sahitya Akademi posts

Protests by Tamil writers 

Sixteen Sahitya Akademi award-winning Tamil writers have condemned the Akademi for not adequately condemning the killing of Kannada writer M.K. Kalburgi and its failure to bring pressure on the Centre to protect freedom of expression.

The situation has come to such pass that there was no security for the life of a writer not to mention the threat to freedom of expression. The Akademi has not condemned the act in no uncertain terms. On the contrary it has just issued a general statement. It is not adequate and we demand that the Akademi take a stronger stand,

the writers said.

The signatories are, as of October 12, 2015: Indira Parthasarathy, K. Rajanarayanan, Ponneelan, Prabanchan, Ashokamitran, Thoppil Mohamed Meeran, 'Kavikko' Abdul Rahman, Vairamuthu, Erode Tamilanban, Mu. Metha, Melanmai Ponnusamy, Puviarasu, Nanjil Nadan, Su. Venkatesan, D. Selvaraj and Poomani.

Reaction from Academy 
The academy's president, Vishwanath Prasad Tiwari, countered the writers' claims by saying that they are mistaken in believing that the academy was not responding to intolerance and violence, pointing out that the vice president of the academy presided over a tribute for Mr. Kalburgi in September, where his murder was strongly condemned.

Other award winners 
 Six Kannada writers returned the State literary award on 3 October. 
 Theater artist Maya Krishna Rao has also returned her Sangeet Natak Akademi award on 12 October.
 Shiromani Lekhak award winner Megh Raj Mitter has also announced to return his award.

Controversy 
Former Sahitya Akademi president Vishwanath Prasad Tiwari has claimed that he has evidence to prove that the so-called “award wapsi” movement in 2015, when more than 50 writers returned their awards to protest alleged growth in intolerance under the Narendra Modi regime, were part of a politically motivated campaign organised by Marxist writers and Hindi poet Ashok Vajpeyi to defame the government in the run-up to the Bihar assembly election.

References 

Protest tactics
Violence in India